Qingdao Grand Theatre is an opera house in Laoshan District of Qingdao, Shandong province, People's Republic of China.

References

External links
 

Opera houses in China
Gerkan, Marg and Partners buildings
Buildings and structures in Qingdao
Theatres completed in 2010
Music venues completed in 2010
Tourist attractions in Qingdao
2010 establishments in China